Fall of Rome may refer to:

History
 Sack of Rome (disambiguation), where the city of Rome is defeated
 Capture of Rome (1870) by the Kingdom of Sardinia
 Battle of Monte Cassino (1944) which included the Fall of Rome; during WWII
 Fall of the Western Roman Empire (476/480)

Music
 Fall of Rome (song), 1987 James Reyne song
 The Fall of Rome (song), 2010 debut song of The Bottletop Band
 The Fall of Rome (tune), 1964 instrumental from the soundtrack for the film The Fall of the Roman Empire (film)
 Fall of Rome (tune), 2012 instrumental from the video game Civilization V: Gods and Kings, see Music in the Civilization video game series

Film and television
 The Fall of Rome (film), 1963 Italian film
 The Fall of Rome (2006 TV episode) episode 6 of Ancient Rome: The Rise and Fall of an Empire

Literature
 The Fall of Rome (1850 novel), novel by Wilkie Collins, see Antonina (Collins novel)
 The Fall of Rome: A Novel (2002 novel), novel by Martha Southgate, winner of the 2003 Alex Awards
 The Fall of Rome: A Novel of a World Lost (2007 novel), a novel by Michael Curtis Ford
 Stargate SG-1: Fall of Rome (comic book arc) 2004 multi-issue arc, see List of Stargate comics

Other uses
 Pandemic: Fall of Rome (board game) 2018 game from the boardgame series Pandemic (board game)

See also

 Operation Achse, and the Nazi takeover of the Italian government after the collapse of the government in Rome
 Late antiquity, the era of the Fall of Rome (Western Roman Empire)
 Historiography of the fall of the Western Roman Empire
 The Fall of the Roman Empire (film), 1964 U.S. film
 Decline and fall of the Roman Empire (disambiguation)
 Battle for Rome (disambiguation)
 Battle of Rome (disambiguation)
 Siege of Rome (disambiguation)
 Rome (disambiguation)
 Fall (disambiguation)